The Heads of British diplomatic missions are persons appointed as senior diplomats to individual nations, or international organisations. They are usually appointed as ambassadors, except in member countries of the Commonwealth of Nations where a high commissioner is appointed. The head of mission to an international organisation is usually a permanent representative. For some nations a consul or consul-general is appointed.

The positions have a dual role, being representatives of the British Monarchy and the British Government; they are recommended by the Foreign, Commonwealth and Development Office, and then approved by Buckingham Palace.

Resident heads of mission

Non-resident heads of mission
The United Kingdom does not maintain a full embassy or High Commission in a number of countries. In each of these cases the head of mission to another country, usually a neighbouring one, is also accredited to the other country (except, at present, for the ambassadors to Haiti and Honduras, who are dedicated but non-resident). In most cases a smaller, local mission provides for emergencies, and is headed by a lesser diplomat or a member of the local British community.

In April 2018 the Foreign Secretary announced the opening of nine new diplomatic posts across the Commonwealth. As a result, some countries which currently have non-resident High Commissioners are to receive resident High Commissioners. The expected dates of residence are noted below for those countries where an appointment has been announced.

Heads of mission to non-sovereign territories

Heads of mission to international organisations

See also
 List of Ambassadors and High Commissioners to the United Kingdom

References

 
 
United Kingdom